Let's Get Physical is an album by Elephant Man released on Bad Boy in 2008.

The first single from the album, "Five-O" features Wyclef Jean.

The song "Willie Bounce" appeared on several mixtapes in early 2006. Elephant Man borrowed the first few bars from "I Will Survive" by Gloria Gaynor.

The second single "Jump" was released on November 6 and it features and was produced by Swizz Beatz.

U.S track listing

Japanese track listing 

In the track "Like a Snake", Elephant Man reuses the lyrics from the song "Shake (Remix)" with the Ying Yang Twins and Pitbull.

References 

2008 albums
Hip hop albums by Jamaican artists
Albums produced by Swizz Beatz
Elephant Man (musician) albums